WWVR (98.5 FM, "The River") is a radio station broadcasting a classic rock format. Licensed to Paris, Illinois, United States, the station serves the Champaign, Illinois, and Terre Haute, Indiana, areas. The station is owned by Midwest Communications, Inc.

Previous logo

References

External links

WVR (FM)
Midwest Communications radio stations